Outward Bound is an international network of non-profit organizations which runs adventure and wilderness education programs.

Outward Bound may also refer to:

Outward Bound-affiliated organizations
 Outward Bound Australia
 Outward Bound Costa Rica
 
 Outward Bound New Zealand
 Outward Bound Singapore
 Outward Bound USA

Other
 Outward Bound (play), a hit 1923 play by Sutton Vane
 Outward Bound (film), a 1930 film adaptation of the play
 Outward Bound (Eric Dolphy album), 1960
 Outward Bound (Sonny Landreth album), 1992
 Outward Bound, a 1966 album by Tom Paxton
 Outward Bound, a 1999 novel by James P. Hogan
 Outward bound, a nautical term for a ship leaving a port and heading to the open sea

See also
Outbound (disambiguation)
Outdoor education
Experiential education
Experiential learning